Boreogadus saida, known as the polar cod or as the Arctic cod, is a fish of the cod family Gadidae, related to the true cod (genus Gadus).  Another fish species for which both the common names Arctic cod and polar cod are used is Arctogadus glacialis.

B. saida has a slender body, a deeply forked tail, a projecting mouth, and a small whisker on its chin. It is plainly coloured with brownish spots and a silvery body. This species is found further north than any other fish  (beyond 84°N) with a distribution spanning the Arctic seas off northern Russia, Alaska, Canada, and Greenland.

The polar cod is known to frequent river mouths. They group in large schools in ice-free waters.

B. saida feeds on plankton and krill. It is in turn the primary food source for narwhals, belugas, ringed seals, and seabirds. They are fished commercially in Russia.

Although very populous throughout the Arctic oceans, it still can be a victim to population threats through human actions. Global warming has increased steadily over the past years, and it has caused an increase in ocean temperatures of the Arctic Ocean. Boreogadus saida live in extremely cold water temperatures, and therefore they have adapted to the cold. Their larvae must be in 3°C to hatch normally, and a rise in ocean temperatures can easily lead to phenotypic changes of this cod species. Possible alterations of the species due to increasing ocean temperatures include, smaller size, reduced fecundity, earlier maturation, and increased investment in reproduction at an early age for some.

References
 Pepijn De Vries, Jacqueline Tamis, Jasmine Nahrgang, Marianne Frantzen, Robbert Jak, Martine Van Den Heuvel‐Greve, Chris Klok, Lia Hemerik (2021). Quantifying the consequence of applying conservative assumptions in the assessment of oil spill effects on polar cod (Boreogadus saida) populations.

External links
Arctic cod, Boreogadus saida University of Guelph

Gadidae
Fish of the Arctic Ocean
Fish of Europe
Monotypic fish genera
Taxa named by Ivan Lepyokhin
Fish described in 1774